Aaron Dewain "Pete" Spratt (born January 9, 1971) is a former American professional mixed martial artist who competed in the Welterweight division. A professional competitor since 1999, Spratt has formerly competed for the UFC, the MFC, Legacy FC, Strikeforce, HDNet Fights, and Shark Fights.

Background

Spratt was born in Denison, Texas and grew up in Sherman, Texas. In high school, Spratt ran track and was a track and field New All-American going into his senior year, and still holds the Sherman High School record for the 400m and Triple Jump. He was also a first Team All-District and All-Area wide receiver on the football team, and a Second Team All-District guard on the basketball team. Spratt earned a full-scholarship to play football at Northwestern State University of Louisiana as their #1 recruit for the 1990 recruiting class. In college, Spratt finished his career at Southeastern Oklahoma State University in Durant, Oklahoma. As a four-year starter, he ended his career at Southeastern as their All-Time career leading receiver. He also finished his senior season as the Oklahoma Intercollegiate Conference Offensive Player of the year, as well as a NAIA first team All-American and finished second in the nation in receiving. He also excelled at track in college, and still holds records in the Triple Jump and Long Jump.

Mixed martial arts career
Spratt made his mixed martial arts debut in early 1999 when he defeated Jeremiah O'Neal by submission (rear-naked choke) in the first round. He then won 9 of his next 14 fights including a win over MMA veteran Rich Clementi to bring his Mixed Martial Arts record to 10–5 before receiving his first call up to the UFC.

He made his debut for the promotion at UFC 37.5 against Zach Light. Spratt defeated Light by first round armbar submission.

Spratt was then defeated by former UFC Welterweight Champion Carlos Newton at UFC 40 before picking up arguably the best win of his mixed martial arts career at UFC 42 defeating Robbie Lawler by submission (due to hip injury) in the second round.

After defeating Lawler, Spratt was offered a shot at the UFC Welterweight Championship along with an $8000 + $8000 contract [$8000 to fight, $8000 for an eventual win]. Spratt wanted $25000 + $8000 (his opponent was getting $50000 + $50000), but UFC declined. Spratt turned down the offer, gave the statement that he felt he was not ready to fight reigning champion Matt Hughes, and was subsequently released from the promotion.

The Ultimate Fighter
He was one of the cast members of The Ultimate Fighter 4, which unlike every other season of the show featured past veterans from the UFC. Although he lost both of his exhibition fights, he was featured on the season finale, defeating Jeremy Jackson by submission (due to neck injury). Spratt then returned to the Octagon at UFC 69 where he was defeated by Marcus Davis. His last fight in the UFC was against Tamdan McCrory at UFC Fight Night 10 where he lost via triangle choke.

Maximum Fighting Championship
Since being cut from the UFC, Spratt has fought on regional shows, where his submission defense has been exposed on many occasions, while also picking up some impressive wins mainly due to his strong stand-up skills and heavy hands.

Most notably, Spratt has fought in the Canadian regional promotion Maximum Fighting Championship where he made his debut at MFC 15: Rags to Riches losing to Ryan Ford via rear-naked choke. He then returned to the promotion over a year later at MFC 22: Payoff where he defeated Nathan Gunn via knockout in the second round.

Spratt next fought Keith Wisniewski on 2 January 2010 losing via submission (rear-naked choke) in the first round but he bounced back in his third fight with the MFC promotion by defeating UFC veteran Luigi Fioravanti via TKO in the third round. In this fight Spratt showed improved takedown defense and ground game.

Spratt was then submitted in his next two fights losing first by guillotine choke to Eric Davila at Shark Fights 13: Jardine vs Prangley before being defeated by Ryan Ford for the second time in their rematch at MFC 25: Vindication via rear-naked choke.

Spratt faced Demi Deeds on 8 April 2011 at  MFC 29: Conquer. After a close first round, Spratt turned up the pressure in the second landing some strong leg kicks and punches until he got on top of Deeds late in the round before quickly transitioning to an impressive armbar finish to gain his first win in almost a year.

Spratt faced Marcus Davis at MFC 30, replacing an injured Richie Whitson, This was a rematch of their first encounter, which Davis won by submission at UFC 69. He lost the fight via unanimous decision.

Independent Promotions
On July 22, 2011, at LFC 7 Spratt racked up his fastest knockout to date, defeating Antonio Flores with a clean overhand left only 18 seconds into the opening round.

March 30, 2012 he fought Daniel Acácio and KO'd him at exactly the 5 minute mark at the end of the third round, due to this technicality the fight was scored a technical decision.

Spratt faced Dan Hornbuckle on February 1, 2013 at Legacy FC 17. He lost the fight via unanimous decision.

Spratt faced UFC vet Tim Means on September 13, 2013 at Legacy FC 23, He lost the fight via knockout due to elbows and punches in the first round. After his loss to Means, he announced his retirement from MMA fighting. Spratt later changed his mind about retiring and after reviewing the footage claimed that while the elbow knocked him down, it was the follow up punches that knocked him out and because they were shots to the back of his head they were illegal shots, and the fight should have been ruled a No-Contest due to illegal strikes. Spratt also stated he would officially appeal the decision with the Athletic Commission; it is unknown whether or not Spratt did submit an appeal, but if he did it was rejected as his fight with Means is still recorded as a loss by popular MMA record keeping sites. Tim Means's manager Tom Vaughn and Legacy FC promoter Mick Maynard didn't respond to MMA Junkie's request for comment regarding Spratt's claim.

Return to MMA
Returning from a one-year retirement, Spratt was expected to face Shane Campbell at MFC 41 on October 3, 2014. However, the bout was cancelled for unknown reasons.

Personal life
Spratt and his wife had a daughter on March 25, 2008. He has two daughters from a previous relationship.

Championships and accomplishments
ISKA U.S. Middleweight Champion

Ring of Fire
ROF Middleweight Championship (One time)
Reality Combat Fighting
RCF Middleweight Championship (One time)
Renegades Extreme Fighting
REF Middleweight Championship (Two times)
REF Middleweight Tournament Runner Up

Kickboxing record (Incomplete)

|-  style="background:#fbb;"
| 2006-03-03 || Loss ||align=left| Kevin Engel || World Combat League || Las Vegas, Nevada, USA || Decision (30–25) || 1 || 3:00
|-
| colspan=9 | Legend:

Mixed martial arts record

|-
| Loss
| align=center| 25–24
| Washington Luiz
| KO (punches)
| Fury FC 20
| 
| align=center| 2
| align=center| 1:40
| San Antonio, Texas, United States
|
|-
| Loss
| align=center| 25–23
| Tim Means
| KO (elbows and punches)
| Legacy FC 23
| 
| align=center| 1
| align=center| 2:24
| San Antonio, Texas, United States
| Retired after the fight.
|-
| Loss
| align=center| 25–22
| Dan Hornbuckle
| Decision (unanimous)
| Legacy FC 17
| 
| align=center| 3
| align=center| 5:00
| San Antonio, Texas, United States
| 
|-
| Win
| align=center| 25–21
| Daniel Acácio
| Technical Decision (unanimous)
| AFC: Amazon Forest Combat 2
| 
| align=center| 3
| align=center| 5:00
| Manaus, Brazil
| Acacio was knocked out with a spinning backfist, it was after the five-minute mark and it went to a decision.
|-
| Win
| align=center| 24–21
| Martin Grandmont
| TKO (punches)
| Instinct MMA 2
| 
| align=center| 2
| align=center| 4:00
| Quebec City, Canada
| 
|-
| Loss
| align=center| 23–21
| Jorge Patino
| Decision (split)
| Legacy FC 8
| 
| align=center| 5
| align=center| 5:00
| Houston, Texas, United States
| 
|-
| Win
| align=center| 23–20
| Antonio Flores
| TKO (punch)
| Legacy FC 7
| 
| align=center| 1
| align=center| 0:18
| Houston, Texas, United States
| 
|-
| Loss
| align=center| 22–20
| Marcus Davis
| Decision (unanimous)
| MFC 30: Up Close & Personal
| 
| align=center| 3
| align=center| 5:00
| Edmonton, Alberta, Canada
| 
|-
| Win
| align=center| 22–19
| Demi Deeds
| Submission (armbar)
| MFC 29: Conquer
| 
| align=center| 2
| align=center| 4:19
| Windsor, Ontario, Canada
| 
|-
| Loss
| align=center| 21–19
| Ryan Ford
| Submission (rear-naked choke)
| MFC 27
| 
| align=center| 2
| align=center| 3:07
| Edmonton, Alberta, Canada
| 
|-
| Loss
| align=center| 21–18
| Eric Davila
| Submission (guillotine choke)
| Shark Fights 13: Jardine vs Prangley
| 
| align=center| 2
| align=center| 3:49
| Amarillo, Texas, United States
| 
|-
| Win
| align=center| 21–17
| Luigi Fioravanti
| TKO (punches)
| MFC 25
| 
| align=center| 3
| align=center| 4:02
| Edmonton, Alberta, Canada
| 
|-
| Loss
| align=center| 20–17
| Keith Wisniewski
| Submission (rear-naked choke)
| Hoosier FC 2: It's On
| 
| align=center| 1
| align=center| 4:07
| Hammond, Indiana, United States
| 
|-
| Win
| align=center| 20–16
| Nathan Gunn
| KO (punch)
| MFC 22
| 
| align=center| 2
| align=center| 4:19
| Edmonton, Alberta, Canada
| 
|-
| Win
| align=center| 19–16
| Alan Woods
| Submission (armbar)
| SCMMA 1: Battle of the Texas Titans
| 
| align=center| 1
| align=center| 3:56
| Frisco, Texas, United States
| 
|-
| Loss
| align=center| 18–16
| Donnie Liles
| Submission (rear-naked choke)
| Strikeforce: Payback
| 
| align=center| 3
| align=center| 1:59
| Denver, Colorado, United States
| 
|-
| Loss
| align=center| 18–15
| John Alessio
| Submission (rear-naked choke)
| Banner Promotions: Night of Combat
| 
| align=center| 2
| align=center| 2:07
| Las Vegas, Nevada, United States
| 
|-
| Win
| align=center| 18–14
| Jason Von Flue
| KO (punch)
| UWC 3: Invasion
| 
| align=center| 1
| align=center| 2:34
| Fairfax, Virginia, United States
| 
|-
|  Loss
| align=center| 17–14
| Ryan Ford
| Submission (rear-naked choke)
| MFC 15: Rags to Riches
| 
| align=center| 2
| align=center| 4:01
| Edmonton, Alberta, Canada
| 
|-
| Win
| align=center| 17–13
| Tristan Yunker
| TKO (cut)
| HDNet Fights: Reckless Abandon
| 
| align=center| 1
| align=center| 1:38
| Dallas, Texas, United States
| 
|-
| Win
| align=center| 16–13
| TJ Waldburger
| KO (punches)
| HDNet Fights
| 
| align=center| 1
| align=center| 1:29
| Dallas, Texas, United States
| 
|-
| Loss
| align=center| 15–13
| TJ Waldburger
| Submission (triangle choke)
| King of Kombat
| 
| align=center| 2
| align=center| 1:30
| Austin, Texas, United States
| 
|-
| Loss
| align=center| 15–12
| Tamdan McCrory
| Submission (triangle choke)
| UFC Fight Night: Stout vs Fisher
| 
| align=center| 2
| align=center| 2:04
| Houston, Texas, United States
| 
|-
| Loss
| align=center| 15–11
| Marcus Davis
| Submission (achilles lock)
| UFC 69
| 
| align=center| 2
| align=center| 2:57
| Houston, Texas, United States
| 
|-
| Win
| align=center| 15–10
| Jeremy Jackson
| TKO (neck injury)
| The Ultimate Fighter: The Comeback Finale
| 
| align=center| 2
| align=center| 1:11
| Las Vegas, Nevada, United States
| 
|-
| Win
| align=center| 14–10
| Matt Brown
| Decision (unanimous)
| International Freestyle Fighting 1
| 
| align=center| 3
| align=center| 5:00
| Fort Worth, Texas, United States
| 
|-
| Loss
| align=center| 13–10
| Josh Koscheck
| Submission (rear-naked choke)
| UFC Ultimate Fight Night
| 
| align=center| 1
| align=center| 1:53
| Las Vegas, Nevada, United States
| 
|-
| Win
| align=center| 13–9
| Wataru Takahashi
| KO (punch)
| Shoot Boxing: Ground Zero Fukuoka
| 
| align=center| 1
| align=center| 2:56
| Fukuoka, Fukuoka, Japan
| 
|-
| Loss
| align=center| 12–9
| John Cronk
| Submission (rear-naked choke)
| Venom: First Strike
| 
| align=center| 1
| align=center| 4:43
| Huntington Beach, California, United States
| 
|-
| Loss
| align=center| 12–8
| Chris Lytle
| Submission (rear-naked choke)
| RSF: Shooto Challenge 2
| 
| align=center| 1
| align=center| 0:46
| Illinois, United States
| 
|-
| Loss
| align=center| 12–7
| Georges St-Pierre
| Submission (rear-naked choke)
| TKO 14: Road Warriors
| 
| align=center| 1
| align=center| 3:40
| Victoriaville, Quebec, Canada
| 
|-
| Win
| align=center| 12–6
| Robbie Lawler
| TKO (knee injury)
| UFC 42
| 
| align=center| 2
| align=center| 2:28
| Miami, Florida, United States
| 
|-
| Loss
| align=center| 11–6
| Carlos Newton
| Submission (kimura)
| UFC 40
| 
| align=center| 1
| align=center| 1:45
| Las Vegas, Nevada, United States
| 
|-
| Win
| align=center| 11–5
| Zach Light
| Submission (armbar)
| UFC 37.5
| 
| align=center| 1
| align=center| 2:25
| Bossier City, Louisiana, United States
| 
|-
| Loss
| align=center| 10–5
| Steve Berger
| TKO (cut)
| UA 1: The Genesis
| 
| align=center| 1
| align=center| 2:14
| Hammond, Indiana, United States
| 
|-
| Win
| align=center| 10–4
| Brian Sleeman
| TKO (submission to punches)
| GC 7: Casualties of War
| 
| align=center| 1
| align=center| N/A
| Colusa, California, United States
| 
|-
| Loss
| align=center| 9–4
| Ronald Jhun
| KO (knee)
| Warriors Quest 2: Battle of Champions
| 
| align=center| 3
| align=center| 4:36
| Honolulu, Hawaii, United States
| 
|-
| Win
| align=center| 9–3
| Jay Jack
| TKO (punches)
| Ring of Fire 3
| 
| align=center| 1
| align=center| 0:55
| Denver, Colorado, United States
| 
|-
| Loss
| align=center| 8–3
| Hector Garza
| Submission
| Renegades Extreme Fighting
| 
| align=center| 1
| align=center| 2:33
| Texas, United States
| 
|-
| Loss
| align=center| 8–2
| Cruz Chacon
| Decision (majority)
| ROF 2: Trial By Fire
| 
| align=center| 3
| align=center| 3:00
| Denver, Colorado, United States
| 
|-
| Win
| align=center| 8–1
| Rich Clementi
| TKO (doctor stoppage)
| Reality Combat Fighting 9
| 
| align=center| 1
| align=center| N/A
| Houma, Louisiana, United States
| 
|-
| Win
| align=center| 7–1
| Jason House
| KO (punches)
| Bushido 1
| 
| align=center| 1
| align=center| N/A
| Tempe, Arizona, United States
| 
|-
| Win
| align=center| 6–1
| Bone Sayavonga
| TKO (submission to strikes)
| Renegades Extreme Fighting
| 
| align=center| 1
| align=center| 1:36
| Texas, United States
| 
|-
| Win
| align=center| 5–1
| Cedric Marks
| Submission
| Renegades Extreme Fighting
| 
| align=center| 1
| align=center| 9:55
| Texas, United States
| 
|-
| Loss
| align=center| 4–1
| Yves Edwards
| Submission (triangle choke)
| Renegades Extreme Fighting
| 
| align=center| 1
| align=center| N/A
| Texas, United States
| 
|-
| Win
| align=center| 4–0
| Doug Carpenter
| Decision
| Renegades Extreme Fighting
| 
| align=center| 1
| align=center| 10:00
| Houston, Texas, United States
| 
|-
| Win
| align=center| 3–0
| Rolando Aguilar
| KO
| Renegades Extreme Fighting
| 
| align=center| 1
| align=center| N/A
| Houston, Texas, United States
| 
|-
| Win
| align=center| 2–0
| Keith Sutton
| KO
| Extreme Shootout: The Underground
| 
| align=center| N/A
| align=center| N/A
| Killeen, Texas, United States
| 
|-
| Win
| align=center| 1–0
| Jeremiah O'Neal
| Submission (rear-naked choke)
| Power Ring Warriors
| 
| align=center| 1
| align=center| N/A
| Texas, United States
|

References

External links 
 Pete Spratt's official website
 
 UFC Profile

1971 births
Living people
American practitioners of Brazilian jiu-jitsu
American male mixed martial artists
African-American mixed martial artists
Welterweight mixed martial artists
Mixed martial artists utilizing American Kenpo
Mixed martial artists utilizing Brazilian jiu-jitsu
Mixed martial artists from Texas
American male kickboxers
Southeastern Oklahoma State Savage Storm football players
Ultimate Fighting Championship male fighters
21st-century African-American sportspeople
20th-century African-American sportspeople